Alhashem-e Sofla (also Romanized as Ālhāshem-e Soflá and Āl-e Hāshem-e Soflá; also known as Āl Hāshem-e Pā‘īn and Marghzār) is a village in Khanandabil-e Sharqi Rural District, in the Central District of Khalkhal County, Ardabil Province, Iran. At the 2006 census, its population was 320, in 68 families.

References 

Tageo

Towns and villages in Khalkhal County